Arthur Zimek is a professor in data mining, data science and machine learning at the University of Southern Denmark in Odense, Denmark.

He graduated from the Ludwig Maximilian University of Munich in Munich, Germany, where he worked with Prof. Hans-Peter Kriegel. His dissertation on "Correlation Clustering" was awarded the "SIGKDD Doctoral Dissertation Award 2009 Runner-up" by the Association for Computing Machinery.

He is well known for his work on outlier detection, density-based clustering, correlation clustering, and the curse of dimensionality.

He is one of the founders and core developers of the open-source ELKI data mining framework.

References

External links
 University homepage
 Publications in the Digital Bibliography & Library Project
 Google Scholar profile

Data miners
Machine learning researchers
German computer scientists
Living people
Ludwig Maximilian University of Munich alumni
Academic staff of the University of Southern Denmark
Year of birth missing (living people)